Easy Now is the third album by American-born singer/songwriter Jeb Loy Nichols, released in 2002 on the Rykodisc record label.

Track listing
"Letter to an Angel" – 2:28
"Better Than Beautiful" – 2:56
"They Don't Know" – 3:44
"Wild Honeycomb'" – 3:45
"A Little Love" – 3:34
"Heaven Help Me" – 3:26
"Mostly Bittersweet" – 3:19
"Sure Felt Good to Me" – 3:44
"Wanna Walk (A Little Bit)" – 0:47
"The Other Side" – 4:41
"Hold Me Strong" – 3:08
"Not the Only Man" – 3:59
"Never Coming Back" – 4:24

Reception

Nichols' third release received mostly positive reviews. Allmusic.com said "The album is bookended by the two best songs he's written: "Letter to an Angel" and "Never Coming Back. Popmatters.com described it as "another inspiring touchstone on what looks like a long and promising future."

References

2002 albums
Jeb Loy Nichols albums
Rykodisc albums